Jerome Foster (born July 25, 1960) is a former American football defensive end and defensive tackle. He played for the Houston Oilers from 1983 to 1984, the Miami Dolphins in 1986 and for the New York Jets from 1986 to 1987.

References

1960 births
Living people
American football defensive ends
American football defensive tackles
Ohio State Buckeyes football players
Houston Oilers players
Miami Dolphins players
New York Jets players
Kettering High School alumni
Players of American football from Detroit